Usha Martin University is a private university located in Ranchi, Jharkhand, India.

Academics 
Usha Martin University offers degree programs in disciplines including undergraduate and postgraduate education. Usha Martin University has the following academic departments:

Faculty of Arts and Social Science
Faculty of Engineering & Technology
Faculty of Business Management and Administrative Studies 
Faculty of Computer Science and Information Technology
Faculty of Special Education
Faculty of Commerce
Faculty of Science

Awards & Achievements 
Since its inception in 2012, UMU has maintained a consistently high ranking in India and a legacy of providing high-quality education to all relevant students. The following is a collection of awards and achievements that UMU has received throughout the years:

“Prof Madhulika Kaushik, Pro Vice Chancellor- APAC Education Leadership Award 2021”

Prof. Madhulika Kaushik, Pro Vice Chancellor, one of the academicians of Usha Martin University has been awarded the coveted APAC Education Leadership Award 2021.

“Outstanding University in Innovative Teaching and Learning Practices 2021”

Due to constructive teaching methodologies, excellent education curriculum and outstanding academicians, the University has been awarded “Outstanding University in Innovative Teaching and Learning Practices 2021” by the prestigious ArdorComm Media Group at Hotel Radisson, Gurugram, on 30 September & 1 October 2021.

“Most Inspiring Vice Chancellor Award”

On 20th October 2020, the honourable Vice-Chancellor of the University, Prof. S.C Garg was conferred the “Most Inspiring Vice-Chancellor Award” by Dynergic Business Solution.

“QS I.GAUGE E-LEAD” Certificate

Usha Martin University is being conferred E-Lead certification by QS I Gauge. UMU is the first university in Jharkhand to be certified for digital competence.

“Best Innovative University-East” Award

Steadily thriving since inception, Usha Martin University now wins the highly exalting award of being the “Best Innovative University-East”, during the magnificent ‘ASSOCHAM National Education Awards 2020’, held on 19th February 2020 in Ranchi (Jharkhand).

“University of the Year for Faculty Excellence 2019” Award

The Academics Insights has chosen Usha Martin University as the “University of the Year for Faculty Excellence 2019”. The award was given in recognition of outstanding and positive accomplishments that University made towards society and the educational fellowship.

“Excellence in Training & Placements” Award

Prestigious Usha Martin University received the award for “Excellence in Training & Placements” during the ’14th World Education Awards 2019′ organized by elets in Delhi from August 9-10.

“Best University of East India” Award

Usha Martin University has been awarded “Best University of East India” during the mega educational event “7th DIALOGUE INDIA Academia Awards 2019” held in UAE on 2nd May 2019.

“Excellent Innovative University Jharkhand” Award

Usha Martin University has been awarded “Excellent Innovative University Jharkhand” during the mega educational event of the ’12th World Education Summit 2018′, which was held in Delhi from 9th-10th August 2018

“Best Emerging University of Jharkhand” Award

Usha Martin University has been awarded “Best Emerging University of Jharkhand” during the mega educational event “6th DIALOGUE INDIA Academia Awards 2018” held on 19th May 2018.

University of the Year 2017 Award

Usha Martin University Recognized as “University of the Year 2017” by Higher Education Review Magazine.

Best Upcoming University in Jharkhand

Usha Martin University has been awarded “Best Upcoming University in Jharkhand” during the educational event “National Education Excellence Award 2017” held on 21st January, 2017. This grand educational event was organized by globally prominent foundation College and Campus, and this honor was given by Hon’ble Governor of Goa, Smt. Mridula Sinha.

See also
Education in India
List of private universities in India
List of institutions of higher education in Jharkhand

References

External links

Universities in Jharkhand
Universities and colleges in Ranchi
2013 establishments in Jharkhand
Educational institutions established in 2013